Turn- und Polizeisportgemeinschaft Frisch Auf Göppingen e.V. is a sports club from Germany, located in Göppingen, Baden-Württemberg. The club's men's handball team plays under the name FRISCH AUF! Göppingen in Handball-Bundesliga. Nine-time champions of Germany, Göppingen were at their most successful during the early 1960s. The club's women's handball team Frisch Auf Frauen also plays in Handball-Bundesliga.

Men's handball team

History
TPSG Frisch Auf Göppingen was founded in 1896 as the Göppingen Gymnastics Club. In October 1920, the club established its own handball division. In 1971, the Frisch Auf Göppingen Gymnastics Club merged with the Göppingen Police Sports Association to form the Turn- und Polizeisportgemeinschaft Frisch Auf Göppingen. The club won nine championships between 1954 and 1972. He spent the 1990s in the 2. Handball-Bundesliga. In 2001, however, they were promoted to the Handball-Bundesliga again. In the 2010s, the club won four EHF Cups (2011, 2012, 2016 and 2017). The "Frisch Auf" part of the club's name is an old German salutation amongst gymnasts.

Crest, colours, supporters

Kit manufacturers

Kits

Accomplishments
Handball-Bundesliga:
 : 1954, 1955, 1958, 1959, 1960, 1961, 1965, 1970, 1972
2. Handball-Bundesliga:
 : 2001
EHF Champions League:
 : 1960, 1962
 : 1959
EHF Cup:
 : 2011, 2012, 2016, 2017
 : 2006

Sports Hall information

Name: – EWS Arena
City: – Göppingen
Capacity: – 5600
Address: – Nördliche Ringstraße 87, 73033 Göppingen, Germany

Team

Current squad
Squad for the 2022–23 season

Technical staff
 Head coach:  Markus Baur
 Goalkeeping coach:  Alexander Vorontsov
 Physiotherapist:  Thomas Hummel
 Physiotherapist:  Sebastian Daebel
 Club doctor:  Dr. Christian Grill

Transfers
Transfers for the 2023–24 season

Joining 
  Erik Persson (RB) (from  Eskilstuna Guif)
  Andreas Flodman (RW) (from  Aalborg Håndbold) 

Leaving 
  Blaž Blagotinšek (LP) (to  SG Flensburg-Handewitt)
  Daniel Rebmann (GK) (to  VfL Gummersbach)
  Kevin Gulliksen (RW) (to  TTH Holstebro)
  Jon Lindenchrone Andersen (RB) (to  Rhein-Neckar Löwen)

Previous squads

European competition
EHF Cup Winners' Cup: from the 2012–13 season, the men's competition was merged with the EHF Cup.EHF Cup: It was formerly known as the IHF Cup until 1993. Also, starting from the 2012–13 season the competition has been merged with the EHF Cup Winners' Cup. The competition will be known as the EHF European League from the 2020–21 season.

EHF ranking

Former club members

Notable former players

  Udo Böbel (1976–1978)
  Peter Bucher (1961–1976, 1984–1985)
  Ulrich Derad (1986–1989)
  Axel Geerken (2008)
  Fabian Gutbrod (2007–2011)
  Michael Haaß (2009–2013)
  Kai Häfner (2007–2011)
  Sebastian Heymann (2016–)
  Markus Hochhaus (1996–1998)
  Peter Jaschke (1976–1980)
  Lars Kaufmann (2009–2011, 2015–2017)
  Tim Kneule (2006–)
  Michael Kraus (2002–2007, 2013–2016)
  Volker Michel (2004–2007)
  Marc Nagel (1999–2004)
  Evgeni Pevnov (2013–2015)
  Adrian Pfahl (2015–2018)
  Uwe Rathjen (1968–1973)
  Daniel Rebmann (2017–)
  Oliver Roggisch (2000–2002)
  Marcel Schiller (2013–)
  Jörn Schläger (2001–2003)
  David Schmidt (2022–)
  Christian Schöne (2005–2015)
  Jens Schöngarth (2016–2019)
  Martin Schwalb (1982–1984)
  Manuel Späth (2006–2017)
  Nicolai Theilinger (2019–2021)
  Willi Weiss (1976–1987)
  Hajo Wulff (2000–2003)
  Nikola Marinovic (2013–2015)
  David Szlezak (2001–2004)
  Dalibor Anušić (2007–2009, 2010–2012)
  Josip Perić (2018–2020)
  Srđan Predragović (2018-2019)
  Enid Tahirović (2008–2013)
  Bruno Souza (1999–2006)
  Krešimir Kozina (2017–)
  Kristijan Ljubanović (2009)
  Josip Šarac (2021–)
  Marin Šego (2022–)
  Ivan Slišković (2018–2020)
  Jalesky Garcia Padron (2003–2009)
  Luděk Drobek (2007)
  Martin Galia (2004–2008)
  Pavel Horák (2007–2013)
  Tomáš Mrkva (2012–2013)
  Jacob Bagersted (2017–2022)
  Allan Damgaard (2017–2019)
  Alix Nyokas (2014–2016)
  Gergely Harsányi (2007–2008)
  Péter Tatai (2016)
  Pouya Norouzi Nezhad (2020)
  Gunnar Steinn Jónsson (2021)
  Janus Daði Smárason (2020–2022)
  Idan Maimon (2000–2001)
  Andrius Stelmokas (2004–2006)
  Žarko Marković (2012–2013)
  Draško Mrvaljević (2009–2012)
  Patrick Kersten (2001–2002)
  Kevin Gulliksen (2021–)
  Thomas Kristensen (2015–2016)
  Maciej Dmytruszyński (2006–2007)
  Jerzy Klempel (1982–1991)
  Adam Weiner (2008–2011)
  Silviu Băiceanu (2006–2008)
  Rareș Jurcă (2008–2010)
  Dragoș Oprea (2002–2015)
  Urh Kastelic (2019–2022)
  Miladin Kozlina (2011)
  Jaka Malus (2022–)
  Vid Poteko (2022–)
  Primož Prošt (2013–2019)
  Jure Vran (2010–2011)
  Marc Amargant (2003-2005)
  Jaume Fort (2001–2004)
  Bojan Beljanski (2012–2015)
  Aleksandar Knežević (1999–2007)
  Nikola Manojlović (2005–2009)
  Mitar Markez (2011–2014)
  Božidar Markićević (2012)
  Vukašin Rajković (2005–2008)
  Momir Rnić (2011–2014)
  Žarko Šešum (2014–2018)
  Nemanja Zelenović (2018–2022)
  Michal Shejbal (2004–2008)
  Tomáš Urban (2017–2018)
  Niclas Barud (2015–2017)
  Andreas Berg (2015–2017)
  Anton Halén (2014–2018)

Former coaches

Women's handball team

History
TPSG Frisch Auf Göppingen was founded in 1896 as the Göppingen Gymnastics Club. In October 1920, the club established its own handball division. The women's section was established in 1923. The team played for the first time in 2006 in the Handball-Bundesliga. The club made it to the finals of the Challenge Cup in 2010.

Crest, colours, supporters

Kit manufacturers

Kits

Team

Current squad
Squad for the 2021–22 season

Technical staff
 Head coach:  Nico Kiener

Transfers
Transfers for the 2022–23 season

Joining 
  Selina Kalmbach (LW) (from  Neckarsulmer SU)
  Leonie Patorra (CB) (from  HSG Bad Wildungen)

Leaving 
  Sina Ehmann (LB) (to  HSV Solingen-Gräfrath)
  Lotta Woch (LB) (to  SV Union Halle-Neustadt)

EHF ranking

Former club members

Notable former players

  Melanie Herrmann (2014–2015)
  Selina Kalmbach (2022–)
  Jenny Karolius (2011–2014)
  Maria Kiedrowski (2011–2014)
  Alexandra Meisl (2007–2010)
  Ania Rösler (2014–2015)
  Maike Weiss (2000–2005)
  Beate Scheffknecht (2011–2015)
  Johanna Schindler (2016–2020)
  Klara Schlegel (2021–)
  Petra Adámková (2016–2020)
  Šárka Frančíková (2020–)
  Michaela Hrbková (2016–2021)
  Alena Unger (2006–2014)
  Edit Lengyel (2015–2022)
  Birutė Stellbrink (2009–2014)
  Tina Welter (2019–2021)
  Jasmina Janković (2011–2014, 2019–2021)
  Wendy Smits (2008–2009)
  Maxime Struijs (2015–2018)
  Anouk van de Wiel (2014–2015)
  Marieke van der Wal (2010)
  Lina Krhlikar (2015–)
  Branka Zec (2018–2020)
  Maja Zrnec (2015–2016)
  Nicole Dinkel (2009–2015)
  Lisa Frey (2020–)
  Seline Ineichen (2014–2015)
  Romy Morf-Bachmann (2019–2021)
  Karin Weigelt (2010–2014, 2017–2018)
  Pascale Wyder (2020–)

Former coaches

References

External links
 (men's)
 (women's)

German handball clubs
Handball-Bundesliga
Handball clubs established in 1896
1896 establishments in Germany
Sport in Baden-Württemberg